Tuczno Castle (German: Schloss Tütz) is a castle in Tuczno, Wałcz County, West Pomeranian Voivodeship, northwestern Poland. It is now refurbished and the site of a hotel. Between 1920 and 1927 Tuczno Castle seated the Apostolic Administration of Tütz, the regional Roman Catholic jurisdiction.

Erection

Tuczno Castle was erected in 1338.

See also
Castles in Poland

References

Castles in West Pomeranian Voivodeship
Hotels in Poland
Wedel family